The International 806 (also Monark 806) is a sloop-rigged sailing yacht built by Ott Yachts and is popular in northern and central Europe. It is designed as cruiser/racer yacht.

History
Monark 806 was launched in 1974 by Monark in Varberg and designed by Swedish yacht designer Pelle Pettersson. Production ended in Sweden in 1977 and was taken up by Danish OL Boats.

References

External links
International 806 Class Association of Germany

Sailing yachts
1970s sailboat type designs
Sailboat type designs by Swedish designers
Sailboat types built in Sweden
Sailboat types built in Denmark
Sailing yachts designed by Pelle Pettersson